Sutemi (written: 捨己) is a masculine Japanese given name. Notable people with the name include:

, Japanese diplomat
, Japanese architect and historian

Japanese masculine given names